No. 664 Squadron was a Royal Air Force Air Observation Post squadron associated with the Canadian 1st Army and later part of the Royal Auxiliary Air Force. Numbers 651 to 663 Squadrons of the RAF were Air Observation Post units working closely with Army units in artillery spotting and liaison. A further three of these squadrons, 664–666, were manned with Canadian personnel. Their duties and squadron numbers were transferred to the Army with the formation of the Army Air Corps on 1 September 1957.

History

Formation and World War II
No. 664 Squadron was formed on 9 December 1944 at RAF Andover as an air observation post (AOP) squadron associated with the Canadian 1st Army. The pilots were officers recruited from the Royal Canadian Artillery and trained to fly at No. 22 Elementary Flying Training School RAF, Cambridge, further developing advanced flying skills at No. 43 Operational Training Unit RAF (43 OTU), RAF Andover. The first commanding officer was Major Dave Ely, RCA; the operational commanding officer was Major D.W. Blyth, RCA. The original members of the modified 664 Squadron were: Maj D. Blyth, Capt Mike Henderson, Capt John Duncum, Capt Brownie Culver, Capt Reg Fuller, Capt Doug Russell and Mr Larry Debank (Sally Ann). In England the squadron operated under the overall control of No. 70 Group, RAF Fighter Command; prior to deployment to the European continent, the squadron was transferred to No. 84 Group, Second Tactical Air Force (2 TAF).
In January 1945, the squadron was deployed to RAF Penshurst, deploying to the Netherlands in March 1945. The squadron flew its first operational sortie over the enemy front in the Netherlands on 22 March 1945. The principal aircraft flown in action was the Taylorcraft Auster Mk. IV and V. After V-E Day on 8 May 1945, the squadron was tasked with flying mail and passengers for First Canadian Army. The squadron continued flying like duties for the Canadian Army Occupation Force (CAOF) until the spring of 1946. 664 (AOP) Squadron, RCAF, was disbanded on 31 May 1946 at Rostrup, Denmark.
Although the squadron's trained aircrew observers performed yeoman service in aerial action against the enemy, aircrew associations across Canada did not grant membership to AOP observers, as those aircrew were not officially issued with cloth wings during the war

Post-war
As the number was not transferred to the Canadian authorities, it was revived post-war when the squadron was reformed as part of the RAuxAF on 1 September 1949 at RAF Hucknall. Equipped with Auster aircraft, the squadron was based at:
RAF Hucknall (1970 (Reserve) AOP Flight)
RAF Ouston (later at RAF Usworth 1965 (Reserve) AOP Flight)
RAF Desford (later at RAF Wymeswold 1969 (Reserve) AOP Flight) 
Yeadon Aerodrome (also at RAF Rufforth 1964 (Reserve) AOP Flight)

The squadron was disbanded, like all other units of the Royal Auxiliary Air Force, on 10 March 1957.

The squadron was reformed in Minden as 664 Squadron of 4 Regiment, Army Air Corps in 1978

Aircraft operated

See also
 No. 664 Squadron RCAF

References

Notes

Bibliography

 Republished by Abel Book Company, Calgary, 2006.

 Library and Archives Canada – Reel #C12430. War Diary of 664(AOP)(RCAF) Squadron.

External links
 664 Squadron Army Air Corps
 History of 664 Squadron

664 Squadron
Aircraft squadrons of the Royal Air Force in World War II
Military units and formations established in 1944